Fitzgerald v Muldoon and Others is a 1976 New Zealand Supreme Court case concerning whether press statements by Robert Muldoon had breached section 1 of the Bill of Rights 1688. In its decision, the court ruled "That the pretended power of suspending of laws, or the execution of laws, by regal authority, without consent of Parliament, is illegal". The case has since become one of New Zealand's most important constitutional law decisions.

Background
The Third Labour Government had passed the New Zealand Superannuation Act 1974 requiring employees and employers to make matching compulsory contributions to a superannuation fund from 1 April 1975. This was to be administered by the Superannuation Board.

As David Williams noted, "The National Party, then in opposition, used all possible parliamentary devices to oppose this legislation and promised to repeal it immediately the Party gained office again. The general election campaign in 1975 had featured an acrimonious debate over the merits of the rival Labour and National superannuation policies." The National Party had suggested in its election campaign, and specifically in the Dancing Cossacks advertisement, that the superannuation scheme would have the effect of leading to Soviet-style communism.

A general election was held on 29 November 1975, at which the Labour Party was voted out of government and on 12 December 1975 the Third National Government was formed with Robert Muldoon sworn in as prime minister. On 15 December, the Prime Minister, who was also minister of finance, issued a press statement declaring,

On 23 December, Prime Minister Muldoon issued another press release,

The plaintiff, FitzGerald, had worked as a public servant since 3 June 1975 and he stated in his affidavit that he had since the beginning of his employment with the Crown, contributed at a rate of one percent of his earnings, amounting to $2.08 a fortnight. He further deposed that the Crown had been deducting this from his gross earnings and transferring this into the fund along with their contribution, until the pay period ending on 24 December 1975.

FitzGerald sued the Prime Minister, as first defendant, and named the chairman and eight other members of the Superannuation Board as second defendant, the Attorney-General (in respect of the Treasury and Department of Education) as third defendant and the Controller and Auditor-General as fourth defendant.

Wild CJ summarised FitzGerald's case as being that the Prime Minister had, in contravention of the Bill of Rights 1688, section 1, made an announcement that constituted exercising a pretended power to suspend a properly made law, the Superannuation Act 1974. FitzGerald sought a declaration that the announcement and instructions issued by the Prime Minister on 15 December 1975 amounted to a breach of section 1 of the Bill of Rights 1688 and also injunctions requiring the withdrawal of the instruction and restraining the Prime Minister from further instructions to the Superannuation Board. A range of other declarations and injunctions was sought against the other defendants for their participation in the suspension of the superannuation scheme.

Evidence
In his judgment Wild CJ surveyed the evidence of four public officials: Sir Arnold Nordmeyer, Chairman of the Superannuation Board; a Mr Kelly, assistant commissioner of the State Services Commission; the chief accountant of the Inland Revenue Department; and the general manager of the Superannuation Corporation.

Judgment

Chief Justice Wild decided in favour of the plaintiff on one issue, that the Prime Minister's purported suspension of the operation of the New Zealand Superannuation Act 1975, "was illegal as being in breach of s 1 of the Bill of Rights, and that the plaintiff is entitled to a declaration to that effect".

Wild CJ also held that whether the meaning of "by regal authority" included the Prime Minister's statement was 

Wild CJ found against the plaintiff that the evidence disclosed that there had been no instructions by the Prime Minister to any members of the Superannuation Board, any government department or arm of state services.

Because there was a high probability that the New Zealand Superannuation Act 1974 would be repealed and the scheme dismantled in the months following the hearing, Wild CJ adjourned all other matters for six months, satisfied that, "In my opinion, the law and the authority of Parliament will be vindicated by the making of the declaration I have indicated".

References

External links
 Excerpt from a 2011 lecture by Mohsen al Attar at the University of Auckland.
 Kos, Justice Stephen --- "Constitutional collision: Fitzgerald v Muldoon v Wild" [2014] OtaLawRw 3; (2014) 13 Otago LR 243
 Law NZ - Fitz v Muldoon - Branches of Govt Summary of essential NZ Public Law Case and related concepts

Constitutional case law
1976 in New Zealand law
1976 in case law
Constitution of New Zealand
High Court of New Zealand cases